Karyna Alehauna Demidik, née Taranda (born on 10 February 1999) is a Belarusian athlete specialising in the high jump. She won a silver medal at the 2017 European U20 Championships and a gold at the 2018 World U20 Championships.

Her personal bests in the event are 2.00 metres outdoors (Lausanne 2019), tying the Belarusian national record, and 1.94 metres indoors (Brno 2019).

International competitions

References

1999 births
Living people
People from Baranavichy
Belarusian female high jumpers
World Athletics U20 Championships winners
World Athletics Championships athletes for Belarus
Athletes (track and field) at the 2020 Summer Olympics
Olympic athletes of Belarus
Sportspeople from Brest Region